Actinodaphne is an Asian genus of flowering plants in the laurel family (Lauraceae). It contains approximately 121 species of dioecious evergreen trees and shrubs.

Species range across tropical and subtropical regions of South Asia, Southeast Asia, southern China, Japan, New Guinea, Queensland, Solomon Islands, and Fiji. There are 17 Chinese species, 13 of which are endemic.

Description
The trees are 3 to 25 m tall, with leaves usually clustered or nearly verticillate, rarely alternate or opposite, unlobed, pinninerved, and rarely triplinerved. 
The flowers are star-shaped, small, and greenish. The flowers are clustered or whorled and are unisexual.
Umbels are solitary or clustered or arranged in a panicle or raceme; involucral bracts are imbricated and caducous. 
The perianth tube is short; perianth segments usually number six  in two whorls of three each, nearly equal, and rarely persistent.  The male flowers have fertile stamens usually 9 in three whorls of three each; filaments of the first and second whorls are eglandular, and of the third whorl are biglandular at the base; anthers are all introrse and four-celled; cells opening by lids; the rudimentary pistil is small or lacking. 
The female flowers has staminodes as many as stamens of male flowers; the ovary is superior; the stigma is shield-shaped or dilated. The fruit is a berry-like drupe seated on shallow or deep, cup-shaped or discoid, perianth tube. It has a small single seed dispersed mostly by birds.

Ecology
Actinodaphne species require continuously moist soil, and do not tolerate drought and frost.
The laurel trees fall within the broad-leaved forests; mid-montane deciduous forests; and high-montane mixed stunted forests.

Selected species
121 species of Actinodaphne are recognized. They include:

References

 
Lauraceae genera
Dioecious plants